Ictinogomphus paulini is a species of dragonfly in the family Lindeniidae which was formerly part of the family Gomphidae,
and known as the Cape York tiger. 
It is a medium to large, black dragonfly with yellow markings and clear wings.
Ictinogomphus paulini is endemic to Cape York, Queensland, Australia, where it inhabits rivers.

Gallery

See also
 List of Odonata species of Australia

References

Lindeniidae
Odonata of Australia
Insects of Australia
Endemic fauna of Australia
Taxa named by J.A.L. (Tony) Watson
Insects described in 1991